Vranić is a Bosnian, Serbian and Croatian surname. Notable people with the surname include:

Dušan Vranić, Bosnian musician
Marko Vranić (born 1978), Serbian footballer
Vladimir Vranić (1896–1976), Croatian mathematician

Croatian surnames
Serbian surnames